White House Compound is a residential locality in Judges Colony under the Rampur thana jurisdiction of Gaya, Bihar, India. It serves the Mirza Ghalib College and Big Bazaar Mall.

References 

Gaya district
Gaya, India